"The Heat's On" is the ninth television play episode of the second season of the Australian anthology television series Australian Playhouse. "The Heat's On" was written by Pat Flower and originally aired on ABC on 2 May 1967 and on 18 September 1967 in Sydney.

Plot
The jet-set niece of the quixotic Mr Paisley involves him in a tilt with vice at a notorious keep-fit club.

Cast
 Frank Thring
 Susanne Haworth
 Jon Finlayson
 George Whaley

References

External links
 
 

1967 television plays
1967 Australian television episodes
1960s Australian television plays
Australian Playhouse (season 2) episodes